William "Bill" Buller (10 March 1929 – 1 December 2007) was an Irish equestrian. He competed in two events at the 1972 Summer Olympics. His son Alfred "Alfie" Buller competed in equestrian at the 1996 Summer Olympics.

References

External links
 

1929 births
2007 deaths
Irish male equestrians
Olympic equestrians of Ireland
Equestrians at the 1972 Summer Olympics
Place of birth missing